Richard S. Ware (born August 6, 1963) is a professional racecar driver and owner of Rick Ware Racing.

When he was nine years old, he began racing motocross and moved up to the BMX class when he was 12.

In 1983, he was named Rookie of the Year in the California Sports Car Club. He went on to win several titles in that series, as well as the SCCA and IMSA. He also competed in the 1984 Long Beach Grand Prix.

In 1990, he moved to North Carolina and made his NASCAR Winston Cup Series debut that year at The Bud at the Glen in the No. 22 owned by Buddy Baker. He spent the next decade running short tracks in the ARCA, and the Busch Series. He suffered injuries in 1996 at Watkins Glen International Raceway, while practicing a Winston Cup car, he crashed into the wall and was unconscious for 45 minutes. He made his return to NASCAR in 1998, when he was unable to qualify for the Save Mart/Kragen 350 in his No. 70 Ford Thunderbird.

He ran 9 of the 14 races in NASCAR West Series in 1999, before he moved up to the Craftsman Truck Series in 2000, where he ran his own No. 51 Chevys, but only ran a limited schedule to sponsorship issues and injuries. Since then, he has run one Craftsman Truck race and is owner of Rick Ware Racing. He is the father of Cody Ware and Carson Ware.

Motorsports career results

NASCAR
(key) (Bold – Pole position awarded by qualifying time. Italics – Pole position earned by points standings or practice time. * – Most laps led.)

Winston Cup Series

Busch Series

Craftsman Truck Series

External links
 
 

Living people
1963 births
Motorcycle racers from Los Angeles
Racing drivers from Los Angeles
NASCAR drivers
NASCAR team owners
ARCA Menards Series drivers
Trans-Am Series drivers